Hannah Maree Rowe (born 3 October 1996) is a New Zealand cricketer. She made her debut in international cricket against England women on 26 January 2015. She is right-hand batsman and bowls right-arm medium pace.

In August 2018, she was awarded a central contract by New Zealand Cricket, following the tours of Ireland and England in the previous months. In October 2018, she was named in New Zealand's squad for the 2018 ICC Women's World Twenty20 tournament in the West Indies. In October 2019, she was named in the Women's Global Development Squad, ahead of a five-match series in Australia. In February 2022, she was named in New Zealand's team for the 2022 Women's Cricket World Cup in New Zealand. In June 2022, Rowe was named in New Zealand's team for the cricket tournament at the 2022 Commonwealth Games in Birmingham, England.

References

External links 
 
 

1996 births
Living people
New Zealand cricketers
New Zealand women cricketers
New Zealand women One Day International cricketers
New Zealand women Twenty20 International cricketers
Cricketers from Palmerston North
Central Districts Hinds cricketers
Cricketers at the 2022 Commonwealth Games
Commonwealth Games bronze medallists for New Zealand
Commonwealth Games medallists in cricket
Medallists at the 2022 Commonwealth Games